XHPE-FM is a radio station on 97.1 FM in Torreón, Coahuila. The station is owned by GREM and carries the La Mejor format from MVS Radio.

History
XHPE received its concession on December 8, 1975 and formally signed on a week later. It was owned by Alonso Gómez Aguirre and was the first FM radio station in the Laguna region.

The concessionaire name, D.L.R. Radio, refers to Luis de la Rosa, one of the owners of GREM.

References

Radio stations in Coahuila
Radio stations in the Comarca Lagunera
Radio stations established in 1975